The 18th Canadian Parliament was in session from 6 February 1936, until 25 January 1940.  The membership was set by the 1935 federal election on 14 October 1935, and it changed only somewhat due to resignations and by-elections until it was dissolved prior to the 1940 election.

It was controlled by a Liberal Party majority under Prime Minister William Lyon Mackenzie King and the 16th Canadian Ministry.  The Official Opposition was the Conservative Party, led first by Richard Bedford Bennett, and later by Robert Manion.

The Speaker was Pierre-François Casgrain.  See also List of Canadian electoral districts 1933-1947 for a list of the ridings in this parliament.

The Social Credit Party led by J. H. Blackmore made their first federal appearance in this parliament.  It would be an important third party until 1980.  The Co-operative Commonwealth Federation led by J.S. Woodsworth also made their first appearance. It, and its successor party, the New Democratic Party, would become a major source of policies that would change the fabric of Canada.

There were six sessions of the 18th Parliament, though the last two were extremely short:

List of members
Following is a full list of members of the eighteenth Parliament listed first by province, then by electoral district.

Electoral districts denoted by an asterisk (*) indicates that district was represented by two members.

Alberta

British Columbia

Manitoba

New Brunswick

Nova Scotia

Ontario

Prince Edward Island

Quebec

Saskatchewan

Yukon

By-elections

References

Succession

Canadian parliaments
1936 establishments in Canada
1940 disestablishments in Canada
1936 in Canada
1937 in Canada
1938 in Canada
1939 in Canada
1940 in Canada